Not One Word Has Been Omitted is the first EP by the progressive metal/mathcore band From a Second Story Window, released under its current title in 2004 by Black Market Activities. It was originally self-released in 2003 under the title The Cassandra Complex. This is the band's only release to feature second vocalist Sean Vandegrift.

The tracks "In a River Where You Least Expect It There Will Be Fish" and "How London Got Its Fog" feature lyrics written by original vocalist Jeff Peterson; these two songs originally appeared on the band's self-titled demo from 2002.

Track listing

Personnel 
From a Second Story Window
Sean Vandegrift - vocals
Joe Sudrovic - bass
Nick Huffman - drums
Derek Vasconi - guitar
Rob Hileman - guitar

Additional personnel
Cole Martinez - Mixing
Adam Wentworth - Artwork and design

References

2003 debut EPs
From a Second Story Window albums
Black Market Activities EPs